William Henry Fitchford (14 May 1896 – 13 April 1966) was an English footballer and cricketer. An inside-left, he scored 14 goals in 98 league and cup games in nine years at Port Vale from 1914 to 1923, and later spent time with Glossop, Congleton Town, Stoke and Northern Nomads. He played Minor Counties Championship cricket for Staffordshire from 1922 to 1928.

Career
Fitchford was an amateur with a good footballing brain playing for Porthill St. Andrew's when he was signed to Port Vale in March 1914. After serving as a Lieutenant in the First World War he finally made his debut for the club on 23 November 1918, being the only scorer for Vale in a 4–1 defeat to Burnley at Turf Moor. He struggled to be given permission to miss work from his banking job to play in matches so was not played as often as he could have been. He played 19 Second Division games in the 1919–20 season, claiming goals against Nottingham Forest and Birmingham at The Old Recreation Ground. He also managed to score the only goal of the Staffordshire Senior Cup final against Birmingham on 15 May 1920. He featured in 25 matches in the 1920–21 campaign, scoring goals against Wolverhampton Wanderers, Bury, and Barnsley. He scored three goals in six league games in the 1921–22 season, getting on the scoresheet against Hull City, Leicester City, and Blackpool. He also was a part of the side that shared the North Staffordshire Infirmary Cup in 1922. He made 19 league appearances and played one FA Cup game in the 1922–23 season, without scoring a goal. He was released at the end of the season, and went on to play for Glossop, Congleton Town, Stoke and Northern Nomads.

Career statistics
Source:

Honours
Port Vale
Staffordshire Senior Cup: 1920
North Staffordshire Infirmary Cup: 1922

References

1896 births
1966 deaths
People from Wolstanton
English footballers
Association football midfielders
Port Vale F.C. players
Glossop North End A.F.C. players
Congleton Town F.C. players
Stoke City F.C. players
Northern Nomads F.C. players
English Football League players
English cricketers
Staffordshire cricketers
British Army personnel of World War I
English bankers
20th-century English businesspeople